Heiyantuduwa Raja (Sinhala:හෙයියන්තුඩුවේ රාජා)(1924-November 6 2002) was a Sri Lankan elephant, which carried the Relic of the tooth of the Buddha casket in the Dalada Perahera for 11 years after the demise of Maligawa Raja. Heiyantuduwa Raja's tusks were each  in length when he was living, and it was considered one of the longest-tusked elephants in the country.

Owner

Heiyantuduwa Raja was captured from the Kattakaduwana jungle in Hambantota District. On 8 March 1945, the tusker had been publicly auctioned by then British Ceylon government at Hambantota Kachcheri. William Gunasekara (also known as 'Heiyantuduwa Ralahami') of Heiyantuduwa in Biyagama had bought him for 10,500 Rupees . Gunasekara was a wealthy landed proprietor and owned fourteen elephants at that era. Later, Heiyantuduwa Raja was owned by his youngest son, Henry Gunasekara of Kandy.

Historic Elephant
Heiyantuduwe Raja participated at the Esala Perahera in Kandy for several years. After the demise of Maligawa Raja, he also carried the casket of tooth relic for 11 years from 1989 to 2000 with permission from Neranjan Wijeyeratne, then Diyawadana Nilame of Sri Dalada Maligawa.  Carrying the casket of tooth relic was an opportunity bestowed upon only a few elephants in Sri Lanka. Heiyantuduwe Raja had also carried the main casket of Buddha's relics at the Kelaniya Duruthu Perahera, Bellanwila Perahera and Gangaramaya Navam Perahera in addition to the Sri Dalada casket.

National Heritage
Heiyantuduwa Raja died on 6 November 2002. He was about 78 years old at the time of his death. Despite an offer of 120,000 U.S. Dollars by a Japanese company, Henry Gunasekara gave his skeleton to the Sri Lankan government in recognition of his part in the nation's heritage. Heiyantuduwa Raja's skeleton has been on display to the public at the National Museum of Colombo since 29 January 2013

See also
Raja (elephant)
Nadungamuwa Raja
List of individual elephants

References

External links 
 Video of Heiyantuduwa Raja

1924 animal births
2002 animal deaths
Individual elephants
Individual animals in Sri Lanka
Elephants in Sri Lanka